Buchema interpleura is a species of sea snail, a marine gastropod mollusk in the family Drilliidae.

Description
The length of the shell varies between 11 mm and 12 mm.

Distribution
This marine species occurs from Mexico to Northeast Brazil.

References

 Dall, William Healey, and Charles Torrey Simpson. The Mollusca of Porto Rico. US Government Printing Office, 1901.

External links
  Tucker, J.K. 2004 Catalog of recent and fossil turrids (Mollusca: Gastropoda). Zootaxa 682:1–1295.
 

interpleura
Taxa named by William Healey Dall
Taxa named by Charles Torrey Simpson
Gastropods described in 1901